Menart may refer to:

 Charles Ménart, Belgian architect 
 Janez Menart, Slovenian poet
 Menart Records, a Slovenian record label